An emergency population warning is a method whereby local, regional, or national authorities can contact members of the public en masse to warn them of an impending emergency. These warnings may be necessary for a number of reasons, including:

 weather emergencies such as tornadoes, hurricanes, and ice storms;
 geological disasters such as earthquakes, landslides, volcanic eruptions, and tsunamis;
 industrial disasters such as the release of toxic gas or contamination of river water;
 radiological disasters such as a nuclear plant disaster;
 medical emergencies such as an outbreak of a fast-moving infectious disease; 
 warfare or acts of terrorism.

Many local areas use emergency population warnings to advise of prison escapes, abducted children, emergency telephone number outages, and other events.

Requirements

In order to develop an effective emergency warning system, certain things are required:

 an agreement as to what constitutes an emergency in the area served by the system. This differs from region to region depending on the local climate, geology, and the like.
 an agreement as to who can initiate an alert. In some countries all warnings are transmitted by a single command center, while in others (such as the United States) a host of local, regional, and national agencies are authorized to initiate warnings.
 a system or systems by which the information can be quickly transmitted to the population.
 an education program to teach the general public how to recognize an alert or what to do if a warning is broadcast.

United Nations program
Early warning system is the term that the International Early Warning Programme coordinated by the United Nations uses for all systems that are used to send emergency population warnings. 

The United Nations Development Programme uses the Send Word Now Emergency Notification System to alert its worldwide staff when an urgent situation arises.

Methods by country

Australia

The Standard Emergency Warning Signal was originally adopted by the Bureau of Meteorology in the 1970s for tropical cyclone warnings. It became a standard national emergency warning signal in 1995. It can be broadcast on radio, television, automated telephone calls and in some places by public address systems in the event of bushfire, flood, cyclone, tsunami, earthquake or terrorist attack.

If there is an emergency, Community Alert sirens will sound to alert the community to be impacted. There are Disaster Alert siren, Tornado Alert siren, Fire Tornado Alert siren, Tsunami Alert siren, Civic defence siren, Flood Alert siren, Hurricane Alert siren, Cloud Tsunami Alert siren and Bushfire Alert siren.

Emergency Alert Australia is also to disturb the normal activities if in emergency. Emergency Broadcast Speakers are also installed for in emergency, the Emergency Broadcast Speakers will announce the information to protect everyone.

Canada
On June 11, 2009, the Canadian Radio-television and Telecommunications Commission (CRTC) approved a proposal by Pelmorex, owners of The Weather Network and MétéoMédia, to receive must-carry status for the channels, in exchange for developing a "national aggregator and distributor" of localized emergency alert messages compliant with the Common Alerting Protocol. The alert system, known as Alert Ready, built on a backend known as the National Alert Aggregation and Dissemination system (NAAD), was first established in 2010, and further expanded as a result of consultation with government officials, broadcasters, and the CRTC. In August 2014, the CRTC ruled that all television stations, radio stations, and broadcast distribution undertakings had to begin mandatory carriage of local alerts relayed through NAAD by March 31, 2015.

The province of Alberta had its own system called the Emergency Public Warning System (EPWS). The EPWS was put into place after a major tornado swept through the city of Edmonton in 1987, killing 27 and causing millions of dollars in damage. Unlike the American EAS, however, broadcast of the EPWS was not mandatory on radio and television stations. It was broadcast on the CKUA Radio Network and was televised on CTV Two Alberta and other participating stations. EPWS warnings could be initiated by municipal police and fire departments, the provincial government, county authorities, tribal government agencies, Environment Canada, and the Royal Canadian Mounted Police. CKUA developed and maintained the EPWS until January 2010, when it lost a bid to modernize the system to an outside vendor (the contract had provided 15% of the station's overall budget). 

In June 2011, an updated version of the system known as Alberta Emergency Alert was introduced, which emphasized multi-platform availability of alerts and advisories on digital platforms, such as online and through a mobile app. Participation in AEA is now considered mandatory under the CRTC's national public alerting mandate.

France

In France, the population warning is made via air raid siren. This network is called the "Réseau national d'alerte" (RNA). The system is inherited from the air-raid siren network (défense passive) developed before World War II. It consists of about 4,500 electronic or electromechanical sirens placed all over France.

In some cases, the warning signal may be played by a mobile system installed on the fire department's vehicles.

The warning signal is described by décret (by law) of March 23, 2007. It consists in a modulated sound going up and down (up to 380 Hz) during the first minute, and repeated three times. The end of alert is a continuous signal lasting 30 seconds.

The system is tested the first Wednesday of every month at 11.45 in the north, 12.00 in the center, and at 12.15 in the south; for tests, the modulated signal is played only once.

When the warning signal sounds, people are expected to remain at home or the building they are in and listen to further instructions on radio via France Info, France Inter, or local stations.

Instructions may also be announced by police or fire department vehicles.

Japan

The J-Alert system launched in 2007 aims to allow government officials to address the population directly via loudspeakers.  It aims to cover earthquake, tsunami, volcano, and military emergencies.

The Earthquake Early Warning system is operated by the Japan Meteorological Agency.  It is capable of delivering warnings a few seconds before S-waves can propagate to distant locations.  Warnings are broadcast by radio and television stations, and compatible equipment can automatically turn on when receiving a message.  EEW capability is also required for all domestic cell phones sold after 2007.

JMA also issues advisories regarding tropical cyclones in the western Pacific Ocean.

New Zealand

South America

Many countries in South America have a mechanism called "cadena nacional". It enables the leader of the country to address the people simultaneously on all TV channels and radio stations, interrupting normal programming. In some countries, such as Argentina and Venezuela, the broadcast of these messages is obligatory. Many of these systems were created by past military governments, and political use of the mechanism is common.

Chile 
The SAE (Spanish: Sistema de Alerta de Emergencia; English: Emergency Alert System) was created as a response to the 2010 Chilean Earthquake after the failure by the national authorities to provide safety precautions and speedy information during the aftermath of the disaster. Since its inception in 2012 and through its official implementation in 2017 onwards, it has been used to provide alerts and information regarding natural disasters such as floods, wildfires, tsunami and earthquake warnings. All cell phones on sale in the country are required by law to be compatible with the SAE system since 2017.

United Kingdom 

Between 1953 and 1992, the UK government had an alert system known as the "four-minute warning". Its purpose was to warn the population, through a combination of air-raid sirens and messages over television and radio, of an impending nuclear missile attack from the Soviet Union; its name derived from the expected amount of time between knowledge of the strike and the missile landing. The system was dismantled following the dissolution of the Soviet Union and the end of the Cold War.

In 2013, the government conducted trials of a public alert system using both SMS messaging and Cell Broadcast technology to send alert messages to mobile devices in areas affected by an emergency. A report was published in 2014 that said the trials were successful and that 85% of people thought that such a system would be a good idea, as well as detailing how such a system could be implemented, and plans for further trials. However, no further trials or implementation of the system came.

On 24 March 2020, the day after the UK went into a national lockdown in response to the COVID-19 pandemic, the government collaborated with the country's four main mobile networks, O2, EE, Vodafone and Three, to send a text message alert regarding the new restrictions to all registered mobile phone numbers across the UK. In order to not overwhelm the networks, the operators sent the messages in batches, going to one million or so numbers at a time. This process took over 24 hours, with some people not receiving the message until the following day. The government was accused of ignoring its own advice from the 2013 trials to set up a dedicated public alert system. In response, it began developing a system using Cell Broadcast technology.

In March 2021, a test flood alert was sent using the new technology to devices in Reading. Another generic test alert was sent to O2 customers on 11 May. Certain BT Mobile customers (with BT Mobile operating on the EE network) received two alerts on 20 May. A more public test of the system was carried out for devices in East Suffolk on 25 May, followed by a test across the UK on 12 June. Further limited tests were sent on 18 and 22 June. All of these test messages were sent specifically marked as operator test alerts, meaning that not all devices receive them. They are received by devices that have the option to receive test alerts turned on in the device settings, and some devices do not have this option. 

The first test alert marked as an actual alert, meaning it will be received by all compatible devices in the given area, was sent on 29 June, again only to devices in Reading. Because this alert would be received by most mobile devices in the Reading area, this alert was given more publicity, with the Cabinet Office posting notices on social media, as well as some mobile networks. Further operator tests were carried out throughout July, August and September. The sound they use is exactly the same as the one in the US, some phones will beep 3 times before the message is read out, whlist other phones will signal a pattern for 10 seconds. There is no mention if alerts would be broadcast on TV or radio.

The government initially planned to make the system fully live and functional in the summer of 2021, but this was later changed to autumn of 2021, and then again delayed to early 2022 and then the summer 2022, with a publicised nationwide alert sent to all devices to demonstrate the system. Alerts should be received by all mobile devices connected to 4G and 5G networks, running Android 11 or later or iOS 14.5 or later. Some older Android devices, as well as other makes and models of phones, may also receive the alerts.

United States

The bulk of emergency warnings in the United States are sent through the Emergency Alert System, implemented in 1997. The EAS can be activated by national, state, regional, or local authorities, including police, fire, weather, and other governmental authorities. EAS is often activated when an unpredicted emergency such as a tornado, earthquake, or release of toxic gas happens. The vast majority of EAS alerts are generated by the National Weather Service.

The Integrated Public Alert and Warning System (IPAWS) program of the U.S. Federal Emergency Management Agency is an attempt to integrate multiple public warning technologies into a coordinated nationwide "system of systems" using the Common Alerting Protocol.  Systems targeted for inclusion in IPAWS include the Emergency Alert System, the Commercial Mobile Alert System using cellular telephones and other wireless devices and the NOAA Weather Radio network.

Many states use existing air raid sirens to warn of tornadoes and flash floods. People living near certain nuclear facilities such as the Hanford Site in Washington have special radios in their home that are set to broadcast a warning signal in the event of a radiological emergency. Some emergencies (AMBER Alerts, for instance) are also sent out via e-mail, cellphone text message, and highway signs. Many U.S. institutions of higher education now use multiple warning technologies on their campuses, including outdoor and indoor sirens, public address systems, email and cell phone text messaging, and digital displays.

Prior to the adoption of the Emergency Alert System, the US used CONELRAD from 1951 to 1963 and the Emergency Broadcast System from 1963 to 1997.

See also
 Alert Ready (Canada)
 Emergency Alert System (United States)
 Standard Emergency Warning Signal (Australia)
 NL-Alert (Netherlands)
 Emergency Mobile Alert (New Zealand)
 Mobile phone alerts in the United Kingdom (United Kingdom)
 Warning system (list of types)
 Prediction of volcanic activity

References

External links 
 ALERT FM- - Commercially available FM radio-based emergency notification system

Disaster preparedness
Civil defense